The 500 metres distance for men in the 2008–09 ISU Speed Skating World Cup was contested over 13 races on seven occasions, out of a total of nine World Cup occasions for the season, with the first occasion taking place in Berlin, Germany, on 7–9 November 2008, and the final occasion taking place in Salt Lake City, United States, on 6–7 March 2009.

Yu Fengtong of China won the cup, while Keiichiro Nagashima of Japan came second, and Tucker Fredricks of the United States came third. Defending champion Jeremy Wotherspoon of Canada suffered an arm injury in race 2 of the first occasion, which stopped him from participating in the rest of the World Cup season.

Top three

Race medallists

Final standings
Standings as of 8 March 2009 (end of the season).

References

Men 0500